PSSC Labs is a California-based company that provides supercomputing solutions in the United States and internationally. Its products include "high-performance" servers, clusters, workstations, and RAID storage systems for scientific research, government and military, entertainment content creators, developers, and private clouds. The company has implemented clustering software from NASA Goddard's Beowulf project in its supercomputers designed for bioinformatics, medical imaging, computational chemistry and other scientific applications.

Timeline
PSSC Labs was founded in 1984 by Larry Lesser.  In 1998, it manufactured the Aeneas Supercomputer for Dr. Herbert Hamber of the University of California, Irvine (the physics and astronomy department); it was based on Linux and had a maximum speed of 20.1 Gigaflops.

In 2001, the company developed CBeST, software packages, utilities and custom scripts used to ease the cluster administration process.

In 2003 the company released the third version of its cluster management software with support for 32-bit and 64-bit AMD and Intel processors, Linux kernel and other open source tools.

In 2005, PSSC Labs demonstrated its new water-cooling technology for high-performance computers at the ACM/IEEE Supercomputing Conference in Seattle, Washington.

In 2007 the company focused on supercomputer development for life sciences researchers and announced its technological solution for full-genome data analysis, including assembly, read mapping, and analysis of large amounts of high-throughput DNA and RNA sequencing data.

In 2008 PSSC Labs designed the Powerserve Quattro I/A 4000 supercomputer for genome sequencing. In 2013 it released CloudOOP Server Platform for Big Data Analytics / Hadoop Server which offers up to 50TB of storage space in just 1RU.

The company Joined Cloudera Partner Program the following year and certified the CloudOOP 12000 in 2014 which is compatible with Cloudera Enterprise 5. In the same year MapR started using CloudOOP 12000 platform for record setting time series data base ingestion rate and the company Joined Hortonworks Partner Program.

In 2015 the company was CloudOOP 12000 certified which is Compatible with Hortonworks HDP 2.2.

References

External links 
 

Computer companies of the United States
Software companies based in California
Development software companies
Companies established in 1984
Computer hardware companies
Cloud computing providers
Privately held companies based in California
Companies based in Lake Forest, California
1984 establishments in California
Networking hardware companies
Software companies of the United States